Marie Agnes Jakus (born ) was an American biologist and microscopist specialized in electron microscopic studies of the fine structure of eye tissues. She was a researcher at the Massachusetts Institute of Technology, Retina Foundation, and the National Institute of Neurological Diseases and Blindness before becoming a science administrator at the Center for Scientific Review.

Early life and education 
Jakus was born  in Ohio to Hungarian immigrants, Anna H. Vintila (née Hovancsik) and Anton Jakus. She had a sister, Florence A. Frash. Jakus completed a B.A. from Oberlin College where she was a student assistant for 5 years. She was a member of Phi Beta Kappa and Sigma Xi. Jakus received a fellowship from Oberlin College in 1938 to study marine invertebrate zoology at Woods Hole Oceanographic Institution. She later worked as a graduate assistant at Washington University in St. Louis between 1938 and 1941, during which she received a fellowship in 1941 to return to Woods Hole to study physiology. Jakus joined the staff of the Massachusetts Institute of Technology (MIT) as a research assistant. At MIT, she began working toward her Ph.D. in biology, receiving it in 1945. Her dissertation was titled The Structure and Properties of the Trichocysts of Paramecium. Jakus' doctoral advisor was Francis O. Schmitt.

Career 
Jakus remained at MIT as a research associate. During her 10 years there, she was awarded a Rockefeller Foundation Fellowship and took a year's sabbatical leave to study at the Institute for Cell Research at the Karolinska Institute. In 1951, Jakus joined the Retina Foundation where she developed a national reputation for electron microscopic studies of the fine structure of eye tissues. She has authored and coauthored publications dealing with electron microscopic and ocular studies, among them, a volume of electron micrographs of ocular tissues and papers describing the fine structure of collagen, paramyosin, trichocysts, and Descemet's membrane in the cornea.

Jakus joined the National Institute of Neurological Diseases and Blindness (NINDB) in 1961 as a program coordinator in vision in the extramural programs. ln this capacity, she was responsible for the administration of research grants and programming activities along disease-oriented lines for all disorders of the eye. She became a science administrator and joined the Center for Scientific Review as executive secretary in the visual sciences study section to review, analyze, evaluate, and process research grant applications. Jakus retired in 1977.

Jakus was a member of the Electron Microscopy Society of America, the American Association of Anatomists, and an honorary member of the Association for Research in Ophthalmology.

Personal life 
Jakus was interested in photography, music, and reading. She was also a "Royal River Rat," a title she earned in 1968 when she shot the complete course of the Colorado River rapids between Lees Ferry and Temple Bar Marina in a rubber raft.

Selected works

References 

20th-century American women scientists
Microscopists
20th-century American biologists
Oberlin College alumni
Massachusetts Institute of Technology alumni
Massachusetts Institute of Technology faculty
National Institutes of Health people
American women biologists
1910s births
American people of Hungarian descent
Scientists from Ohio
Date of death unknown
American women academics